Giác Hải ( fl. 1100) was a Vietnamese Buddhist Zen monk and the most famous disciple of fisherman turned Zen master Không Lộ (1016-1094). He is mentioned in a poem by emperor Lý Nhân Tông (1066–1127). Chapter 11 of 15th Century writer Nam Ông's Nam Ông mộng lục entitled "Tăng đạo thần thông" ( tells the story of how he joined forces with the Daoist master Thông Huyền to slay two demons.

References

Vietnamese Zen Buddhists
12th-century Vietnamese people
Lý dynasty Buddhist monks